Instead of common selection criteria for the entire list, notability of people involved should be checked against the description of each sector.

Sectors are arranged from cultivation through processing, starting from vineyards to consumption advised by sommeliers.

Vineyard owners
Included are owners of well-known or sizable vineyards. Excluded are managers (CEOs) of public holding companies as owners and persons owning vineyards as a hobby, being notable for other reasons.
 
Many vineyard owners are also winemakers as well.

 Jean-Charles Boisset – head of Boisset Family Estates, Burgundy's largest wine producer
 Jean-Michel Cazes – French manager of estates such as Château Lynch-Bages and Château Les Ormes-de-Pez
 Cecil O. De Loach, Jr. – Sonoma County grape grower and winemaker
 Franco Biondi Santi – Winemaker whose family invented Brunello di Montalcino
 Paul Champoux – Washington wine grower
 Marie-Thérèse Chappaz – Swiss organic wine grower
 Noemi Marone Cinzano – Italian businesswoman, and wine grower
 Francesco Marone Cinzano – Italian businessman, and vineyard owner
 Ernest Gallo – largest American wine producer
 Richard Graff – pioneer California winemaker
 Randall Grahm – original Rhone Ranger, owner and winemaker Bonny Doon Vineyard
 Mike Grgich – winemaker of the Chateau Montelena wine that won the white wine competition, the "Judgment of Paris"
 Agoston Haraszthy – Father of Modern Winemaking in California, see Sonoma Valley AVA
 Sir James Hardy – Australian winemaker, businessman and Olympic Games sailor; member of the Hardy's winemaking family.
 Donald M. Hess – Swiss vintner in different countries and founder of the Hess Collection (Contemporary art)
 Jean Hugel – Alsatian wine producer
 Jess Jackson – American wine producer
 Henri Jayer – French vintner, credited with introducing important innovations to Burgundian winemaking
 Kathryn Kennedy – one of the first women to own a California winery
 Charles Krug – founded the first commercial winery in the Napa Valley
 Baron Pierre Le Roy – co-founder of the Institut National des Appellations d'Origine (INAO) and owner of Château Fortia
 May-Eliane de Lencquesaing – owner of Château Pichon Longueville Comtesse de Lalande; Bordeaux wine ambassador
 Alexis Lichine – wine writer and château-owner
 Zelma Long – oenologist and pioneer of women winemaking in California
 Ernst Loosen – renowned German winemaker
 David Lowe – Australian winemaker; owner of Lowe Wines; past President of NSW Wine Industry Association; Vice President of Australian Winemakers Federation
 Alberico Boncompagni Ludovisi – late Italian prince and winemaker of Fiorano
 Giorgio Lungarotti – Italian agricultural entrepreneur and viticulturalist, founder of Cantine Lungarotti Winery
 André Lurton – instrumental in creating Pessac-Léognan as a separate appellation of Graves
 Bernard Magrez – French and global wine estate tycoon
 Thierry Manoncourt – French winemaker and owner of Château Figeac
 Henri Martin – French mayor of Saint-Julien, owner of Château Gloria and Château Saint-Pierre
 Margrit Mondavi – organizer of cultural events at vineyards in the Napa Valley (founder of Copia (museum))
 Robert Mondavi – a leading California vineyard owner; pioneered technical improvements and labeling and marketing wines varietally
 Bill Moularadellis – owner, winemaker and Managing Director of Kingston Estate wines
 Christian Moueix – French president of Établissements Jean-Pierre Moueix and winemaker
 Egon Müller – producer of fine Saar-Riesling
 Gustave Niebaum – founder of Inglenook Winery
 John Patchett – first person to plant a commercial vineyard in the Napa Valley
 Michel Rolland – oenologist and winery consultant
 Nathaniel de Rothschild – founder of the French wine-making branch of the Rothschild family
 Philippe de Rothschild – member of the Rothschild family
 Miguel A. Torres – pioneering Catalan winemaker and President of family wine company Bodegas Torres
 Bob Trinchero – inventor of White Zinfandel
 Aubert de Villaine – French wine expert and co-owner of the Domaine de la Romanee-Conti
 Robert G. Wilmers – owner of Château Haut-Bailly, Crus Classé de Graves in Pessac Léognan, Bordeaux
 Warren Winiarski – winemaker of the Stag's Leap Wine Cellars wine that won the Cabernet Sauvignon competition at the Paris Wine Tasting of 1976

Viticulturists 

Cultivation and harvesting of grapes.

 John Adlum – father of American viticulture
 Helmut Becker – German viticulturist
 Andy Beckstoffer – California viticulturist
 Romeo Bragato – New Zealand wine pioneer
 James Busby – widely regarded as the "father" of the Australian wine industry
 Jules Chauvet – French chemist, considered the "father" of French natural winemaking
 Henri Enjalbert – French professor of geography and specialist in wine geology
 Konstantin Frank – "father" of vinifera wine growing in the Eastern United States
 Pierre Galet – French ampelographer and author
 Hermann Jaeger –  Swiss-American viticulturist, created over 100 new grape varieties, notable hybrid was Jaeger 70
 Carole Meredith – geneticist who discovered the parentage of Cabernet Sauvignon, Chardonnay, Syrah and Zinfandel
 Hermann Müller (Thurgau) – Swiss oenologist, developed the Müller-Thurgau grape variety
 Abraham Izak Perold – developed the Pinotage grape variety
 Oscar Renteria – Californian viticulturalist
 Albert Seibel – French hybridist (1844–1936) who made "Seibel grapes", which are hybrids of Vitis vinifera and Vitis riparia
 Dr. Richard Smart – Australian viticulturalist
 Gil Wahlquist – Australian pioneer organic winemaker

Oenologists 

The science and study of wine and winemaking.
 Alberto Antonini – Italian oenologist and winery consultant
 Walter Clore – "father of Washington wine"
 Jean-Luc Colombo – Rhone Valley oenologist and winemaker*
 Denis Dubourdieu – winemaker, professor of oenology at the University of Bordeaux
 Max Léglise – French oenologist
 Thomas Munson – his proposal saved European wine industry from extinction
 Ann C. Noble – inventor of the Aroma Wheel
 Dom Perignon – Benedictine monk incorrectly credited with the invention of Champagne
 Émile Peynaud – renowned French oenologist
 Jacques Puisais – French oenologist and taste philosopher

Winemakers 

 Kristen Barnhisel – California winemaker
 Heidi Peterson Barrett – winemaker of California cult wines, called by Robert Parker "the first lady of wine"
 A. W. Baxter – winemaker of Veedercrest Vineyards, which competed in the "Judgement of Paris"
 Ntsiki Biyela – first black female winemaker in South Africa
 Cathy Corison – winemaker and consultant
 Didier Dagueneau – Loire winemaker of Sauvignon blanc cult wine
 Barbe-Nicole Ponsardin-Cliquot – Champagne and namesake of Veuve Cliquot
 Stéphane Derenoncourt – French winemaker and winery consultant
 Paul Draper – winemaker of Ridge Vineyards
 Peter Gago – Australian winemaker and writer
 Mia Klein – California winemaker
 Robin and Andréa McBride – African American winemakers and founders of McBride Sisters Wine Company
 Justin Meyer – monk and winemaker at Christian Brothers  
 Maurice O'Shea – Australian pioneer winemaker
 Eben Sadie – South African winemaker of the Sadie Family
 Max Schubert – leading winemaker and creator of Penfolds Grange
 Carol Shelton – California wine producer and pioneer
 Kay Simon – Washington wine producer and pioneer
 Lane Tanner – California winemaker
 André Tchelistcheff – "Dean of American Winemakers"
 Sean Thackrey – American experimental winemaker
 József Törley – founder of József Törley & Co., Hungary's most successful sparkling wine producer
 Helen Turley – California winemaker and consultant

Wine merchants 

 Lalou Bize-Leroy – Burgundian wine producer and former co-manager of Domaine de la Romanée-Conti
 Louis Bohne – famous sales agent of Veuve Clicquot
 Pierre Castel, French wine industry leader
 Christian Delpeuch – wine official and Plan Bordeaux promoter
 Georges Duboeuf – innovative and large Beaujolais bottler
 Charles Heidsieck – Champagne house founder
 Claude Moët – Champagne house founder
 Jean-Rémy Moët – Champagne merchant
 René Renou – French wine industry leader
 Hardy Rodenstock – wine collector and alleged wine fraud, subject of The Billionaire's Vinegar
 Jean-Claude Rouzaud – Champagne executive
 André Simon – wine merchant, gourmet, and wine writer
 Steven Spurrier – British wine authority, organized the Paris Wine Tasting of 1976

Wine critics 

Included are wine professionals at an elevated level compared with Wine writers, being authorities on wine tasting, having established rating systems or written reference works.
   
 

 Pierre Brejoux – Inspector General of the Appellation d'Origine Controlee Board
 Michael Broadbent, MW – influential British wine critic and auctioneer
 Jeb Dunnuck – reviewer for The Wine Advocate and eRobertParker.com   
 Gerhard Eichelmann – German wine critic
 Robert Finigan – American wine and restaurant critic
 Patricia Gallagher – judge at the "Judgement of Paris" tasting
 Antonio Galloni – American wine critic, formerly of The Wine Advocate; founder of Vinous
 Joshua Greene – American wine critic, publisher and editor-in-chief of Wine & Spirit
 Huon Hooke – Australian wine critic
 James Laube – American wine critic of Wine Spectator
 Jeannie Cho Lee – first Asian Master of Wine
 Gian Luca Mazzella – international wine critic, journalist and documentarian
 Allen Meadows – American wine critic of Burgundy and Pinot Noir wine with the Burghound.com newsletter
 Jasper Morris, MW – British wine expert
 Robert M. Parker, Jr. – American wine critic, referenced in the term Parkerization of wine
 Lisa Perrotti-Brown - American wine critic for The Wine Advocate, Master of Wine
 Jancis Robinson, MW – wine writer and educator from the UK
 David Schildknecht – American wine critic
 Ricky Schraub – California wine critic
 Stephen Tanzer – American wine critic and editor
 Jon Winroth – American wine critic and educator

Wine writers 
Included are media professionals who published about wines in major newspapers, on important TV channels, wrote books or created corresponding websites. Excluded are persons who are mainly known for other reasons and might have published about wine as minor activity.

Eric Arnold – American author, former wine columnist of Forbes.com
 Eric Asimov – American wine columnist of The New York Times
 Tim Atkin – Master of Wine, journalist, broadcaster, judge
 Ausonius – frequently cited by historians of winemaking, as his works give early evidence of large-scale vineyards and viticulture in France
 Robert Lawrence Balzer – pioneering American wine writer; organizer of the New York Wine Tasting of 1973
 Nicolas Belfrage, MW – British wine writer, Italian wine expert
 Edward Behr – publisher/editor of The Art of Eating
 Jacques Berthomeau – wine writer, author of The Berthomeau Report
 Michel Bettane – French wine writer
 Jon Bonné – American wine columnist of San Francisco Chronicle
 Tom Cannavan – Scottish wine journalist and internet wine site pioneer
 Laura Catena – founder of Catena Institute of Wine, author
 Oz Clarke – British wine writer and TV personality
 Clive Coates, MW – British wine writer
 Katherine Cole – American wine writer, and journalist
 Tyler Colman – American author and wine blogger publishing under the pen name Dr.Vino.com
 Patrick Comiskey – American wine writer of Wine & Spirits and Los Angeles Times
 Julia Coney – Wine writer and creator of Black Wine Professionals database
 Tullio De Rosa – Italian author
 Andrew Dornenburg – wine columnist of The Washington Post
 Michel Dovaz – wine teacher and writer
 Len Evans – central figure in Australian wine industry
 Mary Ewing-Mulligan, MW – American author and wine educator
 Joe Fattorini – British wine expert and television and radio personality 
 Alice Feiring – American wine writer and "natural wine" advocate
 Doug Frost, MW, MS – American author and wine consultant
 Dorothy Gaiter and John Brecher – former wine columnists of The Wall Street Journal
 Rebecca Gibb, MW – British journalist, editor and Master of Wine
 Paul Gillette – American author and wine writer, an early host of wine show on television
 Malcolm Gluck – British wine writer
 Jamie Goode – British writer and blogger
 Jilly Goolden – British wine critic, journalist and television personality
 Paul Gregutt – wine columnist for The Seattle Times and Pacific Northwest editor of Wine Enthusiast Magazine
 Dara Moskowitz Grumdahl – American wine writer
 James Halliday – Australian wine critic and winemaker
 Anthony Hanson – MW – British Burgundy wine expert
 Steve Heimoff – American wine critic of Wine Enthusiast Magazine, author and wine blogger
 Andrew Jefford – English author and editor of wine books
 Hugh Johnson – British wine writer
 Marilyn Johnson – Bordeaux wine writer
 Robert Joseph – British wine writer
 Richard Juhlin – Swedish writer focusing on Champagne, one of the leading Champagne connoisseurs in the world
 André Jullien – French wine writer
 Odette Kahn – leading wine writer and authority in France
 Matt Kramer – American wine writer and columnist of The New York Sun, The Oregonian and Wine Spectator
 Monica Larner – Italian reviewer for The Wine Advocate
 John Livingstone-Learmonth – British wine writer, world expert on Rhone wines
 Kermit Lynch – American wine merchant, author
 Peter Liem – American wine writer in Champagne, publisher of ChampagneGuide.net
 Will Lyons – British wine columnist for The Wall Street Journal
 Natalie MacLean – Canadian wine writer and subscription website publisher
 Karen MacNeil – American author, journalist and wine educator
 Neal Martin – reviewer for The Wine Advocate
 Campbell Mattinson – Australian wine writer, editor and author
 Elin McCoy – American author, Bloomberg Markets wine journalist, biographer of Robert M. Parker, Jr.
 Jay McInerney – American novelist and author of A Hedonist in the Cellar
 Georges J. Meekers – wine writer, educator and founder of Wine Campus
 Debra Meiburg, MW – Hong Kong based wine educator, journalist and wine judge
 Remington Norman – British wine writer
 Kerin O'Keefe – American wine critic and author
 Mark Oldman – author and columnist for The Food Network
 Jeremy Oliver – independent Australian wine writer
 Lawrence Osborne – British journalist, novelist, and author of The Accidental Connoisseur
 Karen Page – wine columnist of The Washington Post
 Edmund Penning-Rowsell – British wine writer
 David Peppercorn, MW – British wine writer
 Frank J. Prial – wine columnist for The New York Times
 John Radford – author of wine books, and Spanish wine enthusiast
 Daniel Rogov – Israeli wine critic
 Arne Ronold, MW – Norwegian wine writer and educator
 Anthony Rose – British wine writer for The Independent
 Frank Schoonmaker – wine writer who promoted labeling wines by grape variety
 Joanna Simon – British wine writer for The Sunday Times
 Pat Simon, MW – British wine writer and importer
 Jennifer Simonetti-Bryan, MW – American wine educator/lecturer
 Olly Smith – British wine expert, present, author and columnist
 Mike Steinberger – American wine columnist of Slate
 Kilien Stengel – author of wine books
 Tom Stevenson – British wine writer and Champagne specialist
 James Suckling – American wine critic formerly of Wine Spectator
 Serena Sutcliffe, MW – British wine writer and the head of Sotheby's International Wine Department
 George M. Taber – American wine writer
 Tammie Teclemariam, American wine journalist
 Anthony Terlato – American wine expert
 Bob Thompson – American wine writer and California specialist
 Keith Wallace American wine expert and founder of the Wine School of Philadelphia
 Tom Wark – California wine PR executive and blogger of "Fermentation"
 Alder Yarrow – American wine blogger of Vinography.com
 Franco Ziliani – Italian journalist and wine critic of VinoWire.com

Sommeliers 

A trained and knowledgeable wine professional, normally working in fine restaurants, who specializes in all aspects of wine service as well as wine and food pairing. Somebody with a Master Sommelier Diploma issued by the Court of Master Sommeliers or a French Maître Sommelier can be included in this list. 

 Benoît Allauzen – sommelier
 Gerard Basset, MW, MS – British hotelier and world sommelier championship holder
 Jamie Drummond – Scottish/Canadian sommelier
Andreas Larsson  –  Swedish sommelier and world sommelier championship holder
 Jonathan Nossiter – American filmmaker and sommelier, director of Mondovino
 Andrea Immer Robinson – wine expert
Shinya Tasaki  –  Japanese sommelier and world sommelier championship holder
 Alpana Singh, MS – American sommelier, youngest woman ever to achieve the Master Sommelier designation
Giuseppe Vaccarini – Italian sommelier and world sommelier championship holder
 Christian Vanneque – sommelier, French wine expert

Others 
 Ted Allen – television personality and food and wine expert
 Pancho Campo – Spanish/Chilean event organiser and former MW
 William Vere Cruess – American food scientist who led the rebirth of California wines after the end of Prohibition in 1933
 Prince Leo Galitzine – founder of Russian wine-making industry (Massandra, Novyi Svet, Abrau-Dyurso)
 Rudy Kurniawan – collector and convicted wine counterfeiter
 Eric LeVine – creator of the wine database software CellarTracker, now GrapeStories
 David Lynch – American wine writer, restaurant wine director
 Raymond Oliver – restaurant owner; judge in Paris Wine Tasting of 1976
 Nello Olivo – California wine maker who brought recognition to the El Dorado AVA wine region outside of Napa Valley
 Roger Scruton – British philosopher, wine columnist of the New Statesman and lecturer on wine philosophy
 Charles F. Shaw – wine marketing innovator
 Pierre Tari – Secretary General of the Association des Grands Crus Classés
 Gary Vaynerchuk – vlog wine critic of Wine Library TV
 Jean-Claude Vrinat – French wine expert and owner of the restaurant Taillevent
 William Charles Winshaw – pioneer South African vintner
 Kevin Zraly – American wine educator and author

See also
 List of celebrities who own wineries and vineyards

References

Lists of people by occupation

Personalities